The Kozma Street Cemetery is the biggest Jewish cemetery of Budapest, Hungary. It is located next to the New Public Cemetery (Újköztemető).

Jewish cemetery 

The Jewish cemetery, one of the largest in Europe, is well known for its unusual monuments and mausoleums.  Unusually for a Jewish cemetery, these include sculpted human figures and elaborate mausoleums in a variety of styles, most notably several mausoleums in the art nouveau or Jugendstil style.

Kozma Street Cemetery was opened in 1891 by the Neolog Jewish community of Budapest. During its history it has been the burial place of more than 300,000 people. It still serves the Hungarian Jewish community, which is the third largest in Europe.

In 2016, the remains of about 20 people, believed to be Jews who were among the thousands shot on the banks of the Danube River in 1944–1945 by the Hungarian Arrow Cross, and which were found during the renovation of a bridge in 2011, were brought to burial at the Kozma Street Cemetery. 

The green tile-clad mausoleum of the Schmidl family by  Ödön Lechner and  Béla Lajta, drawing its inspiration form Hungarian folk art, is considered an important example of Magyar-Jewish architectural style, as is the domed cemetery chapel by Béla Lajta.

References

External links

 
 Jewish Cemeteries of Budapest at Jewish.hu
 

1891 establishments in Hungary
Jewish cemeteries in Hungary
Parks in Budapest
Cemeteries in Budapest
Art Nouveau architecture in Budapest
Art Nouveau cemeteries
Cemeteries established in the 1890s